Guttate psoriasis (also known as eruptive psoriasis) is a type of psoriasis that presents as small (0.5–1.5 cm in diameter) lesions over the upper trunk and proximal extremities; it is found frequently in young adults.

The term "guttate" is used to describe the drop-like appearance of skin lesions. Guttate psoriasis is classically triggered by a bacterial infection, usually an upper respiratory tract infection.

Signs and symptoms 
Typically, guttate psoriasis erupts after a throat infection, or strep throat. Initially, when the throat infection has cleared up, the person can feel fine for several weeks before noticing the appearance of red spots. They appear small at first, like a dry red spot which is slightly itchy. When scratched or picked, the top layer of dry skin is removed, leaving dry, red skin beneath with white, dry areas marking where flakes of dry skin stop and start. In the weeks that follow, the spots can grow to as much as an inch in diameter. Some of the larger ones may form a pale area in the center which is slightly yellow.

Guttate psoriasis can occur on any part of the body, particularly the legs, arms, torso, eyelids, back, bottom, bikini line, and neck. The number of lesions can range from 5 to over 100. Generally the parts of the body most affected are seen on the arms, legs, back and torso.

Causes 
Genetic and environmental factors can influence the predilection for guttate psoriasis. Human leukocyte antigens, especially those in the HLA-C group are associated with the skin disorder. Beta-hemolytic streptococci infection is the major contributing environmental factor. The typical route of infection is the upper respiratory system. Rarely it is also caused by a skin infection surrounding the anus (perianal streptococcal dermatitis).

Diagnosis 
Guttate psoriasis can typically be diagnosed by clinical examination alone.

Management 
The treatments used for plaque psoriasis can also be used for guttate psoriasis. Few studies have specifically focused on guttate psoriasis management, so there are currently no firm guidelines for managing guttate psoriasis differently from plaque psoriasis. Immunosuppressive drugs that inhibit T cell activation have been effective in treating severe cases of chronic guttate psoriasis. Due to the role streptococcal infection plays in the development of guttate psoriasis, systemic antibiotics have been considered as a potential treatment option. There is uncertain evidence whether systemic antibiotics or tonsillectomy are effective and safe in treating the disease.  The condition often clears up on its own within weeks to months, and only about one third of patients will develop chronic plaques.

Epidemiology 
Guttate psoriasis accounts for approximately 2% of psoriasis cases.

Gallery

References

External links 

Psoriasis